is the third book of Japanese artist Toriyama Sekien's Gazu Hyakki Yagyō tetralogy, published c. 1781. These books are supernatural bestiaries, collections of ghosts, spirits, spooks and monsters, many of which Toriyama based on literature, folklore, and other artwork. These works have had a profound influence on subsequent yōkai imagery in Japan. Konjaku Hyakki Shūi is preceded in the series by Gazu Hyakki Yagyō and Konjaku Gazu Zoku Hyakki, and succeeded by Gazu Hyakki Tsurezure Bukuro.

A version of the tetralogy translated and annotated in English was published in 2016, which included this work, whose title is rendered as More of the Demon Horde from Past and Present.

List of creatures 
The three volumes were titled Cloud (雲), Mist (霧), and Rain (雨).

First Volume – Cloud

Second Volume – Mist

Third Volume – Rain

Bashōnosei

Bashōnosei (ばしょうのせい, Japanese banana spirit) is a ghost in Toriyama Sekien's collection of monster paintings, "Konjaku Hyakki Shūi". The spirit of Basho transforms a person by taking the form of a person.

Overview
According to the commentary of "Hundred demon hunting", "The story that Basho's spirit can turn into a person is in Karato (China), and the song" Basho "was created by this." Of the "Koukai Shimbun Iken" There is a mysterious story where Basho's spirit turns into a human figure, and Basho's spirit appears as a woman under a monk who is reading a book and asks, "Is it possible to make a heartless plant or Buddha?" "Bashio" is based on the Chinese "Hukai Shimbun".

See also 
Gazu Hyakki Yagyō
Konjaku Gazu Zoku Hyakki
Gazu Hyakki Tsurezure Bukuro

References

Further reading
http://scene5.com/yokai/database/index/b3.htm
http://park.org/Japan/CSK/hyakki/etc/obake_index-iroha.html

External links 

Edo-period works
Yōkai